The Cornell University Department of History is an academic department in the College of Arts and Sciences at Cornell University that focuses on the study of history.  Founded in 1868, it is one of Cornell's original departments and has been a center for the development of professional historical research institutions in the United States, including the American Historical Association and the American Historical Review. It remains a highly-ranked program in the field and its alumni and faculty have won Nobel and Pulitzer Prizes, among other distinctions. In addition, many of Cornell's presidents have served among its ranks.

History

The department was founded in 1868 by President Andrew Dickson White as one of Cornell's original departments as the Department of History and Political Science.  White had already earned a reputation as an up-and-coming historian, having taught at the University of Michigan as a Professor of History and English Literature from 1857 to 1863 and as a Lecturer of History from 1863 to 1867, while serving as a New York State Senator. Employing his reputation as a well-regarded historian in his own right, White attracted other notable and rising historians of the day to his department.  He convinced Goldwin Smith to leave his comfortable post at Oxford and travel across the Atlantic to rural, upstate New York. When Smith realized just how lacking the new university's library was for historical study, he promptly had his entire 3,400 book collection shipped from England for donation to the Cornell University Library and made a $2,500 bequest for the purchase of more historical works. From the College of Horace Mann (later known as Antioch College), White attracted their Department Chairman William Channing Russel. Russel would later serve as the Department Chairman, Cornell's Vice President and acting President during White's long periods abroad.

In 1881, the department notably hired the first, full-time chair of American history ever.  In the spring of 1872, non-resident professor George Washington Greene, grandson of American Revolutionary War General Nathanael Greene, offered a series of lectures on American history.  Upon Russel's stepping down as the Department Chairman in 1881, the department attracted Moses Coit Tyler from the University of Michigan to take Russel's position.  At Tyler's request, he exclusively taught American history .

In 1884, the department founded the American Historical Review in a joint effort with Harvard's Department of History in the model of the English Historical Review and the French Revue Historique.  Also in 1884, Professors White and Charles Kendall Adams founded the American Historical Association with a handful of other leading historians of the day and both would later serve as its president. Other Cornellians to head the American Historical Association include faculty members Carl L. Becker and Mary Beth Norton, as well as alumnus Robert Roswell Palmer.

In  1887, the Department was renamed the President White School of History and Political Science in honor of Andrew Dickson White's service to the university and the donation of his large personal library.  Over the summer, the board of trustees nominated White, who was no longer university president, to be Dean of the school and Honorary Lecturer on History and Political Science, but White declined the offer.  Soon thereafter, president Charles Kendall Adams, White's protégé, sought a younger dean and interviewed Woodrow Wilson and Herbert Baxter Adams for the position.  Adams notably did not interview the older Moses Coit Tyler, current department chairman, or Herbert Tuttle, an associate professor, to much annoyance of Taylor and the faculty in general. The trustees eventually overrode Adams and installed Tyler as Dean.

On June 18, 1891, the Cornell Board of Trustees resolved that steps be taken to form a "Department of History, Political and Social Science, and General Jurisprudence" and the following year, the faculty of economics and finance and political and social institutions broke off into a single department separate from the White School.   As the history and government departments were moved around campus over the next few decades, the White School became a more informal grouping of the two departments.  In September 1932, Cornell revived the White School by moving the two disconnected departments to Boardman Hall, allocating space for three classrooms, administrative offices, and graduate student areas. White's will stipulated that on the death of his daughter (Karin A. White), his estate would be used to maintain the President White School. As the school no longer existed when she died in 1971, trustees used the funds to endow a professorship in history.

Reputation

U.S. News & World Reports 2017 rankings of graduate programs places the department 11th overall in the United States, maintaining its 2013 position.

Many alumni and faculty members have won  major awards for their work as historians.  Alumnus Robert Fogel was the co-recipient of the 1993 Nobel Prize in Economics, in recognition of his quantitative historical analyses. Walter LaFeber won the Bancroft Prize in 1996 and David Brion Davis won in 1976.  LaFeber also won the Beveridge Award in 1962 and Davis received it in 1975.  The French government awarded Steven Kaplan the Ordre national du Mérite and named Henry Guerlac Chevalier de la Légion d'Honneur.  Anthony Grafton won the Balzan Prize.

Numerous people associated with the department have won Pulitzer Prizes.  Former faculty member Fredrik Logevall was the recipient of the 2013 Pulitzer Prize for History. Michael Kammen was the 1973 winner of the prize. Professor David Brion Davis won in the category of General Non-Fiction in 1969.  Alumnus David Oshinsky won the award for History in 2006, and alumna Sheryl WuDunn won the award for International Reporting in 1990.

Alumnus John Mott was the co-recipient of the 1946 Nobel Peace Prize for his work as the head of the YMCA.

Two buildings at Cornell's main campus are named in honor of history department professors.  White Hall, one of the original three buildings on the Arts Quad, named after Andrew Dickson White, and Becker House, a residential college named after Carl L. Becker in recognition of his pedagogical contributions to the Cornell community.

Department in popular culture
The Onion, a parody newspaper, featured an article about fictional History Department professor Wallace Schroeder on September 9, 1997, titled "Byzantine Empire Will Fall To Turks, Historian Warns".

In The Office, salesman Andy Bernard minored in history at Cornell.

Notable people

Faculty

The department's first faculty included university president Andrew Dickson White and English historian Goldwin Smith.  In 1881, the department named Moses Coit Tyler the first professor of American history in the United States.  Three of Cornell's twelve presidents have been members of the department: Andrew Dickson White, Charles Kendall Adams, and Hunter R. Rawlings III.  The longest teaching member of the faculty was Frederick Marcham who, upon completing his graduate work at Cornell in 1924, continued lecturing until a month before his death in 1992 – a total of 68 years.

Current faculty

The following is only a partial list.

Former faculty and faculty emeriti

Alumni

Undergraduate alumni

Note: Does not include those who have become faculty in the department, who are denoted by class year above, or those who also earned graduate degrees from the department, noted below.

Graduate alumni

References

External links and further reading
 Department homepage
 Landmarks of Tompkins County, New York, a history of the department
  - a Cornell Daily Sun article from October 19, 1887 regarding the founding of the President White School of History and Political Science
 Another extensive history of the first 40 years of the department

History

History departments in the United States